Rocket Raccoon is a character appearing in American comic books published by Marvel Comics. Created by writer Bill Mantlo and artist Keith Giffen, the character first appeared in Marvel Preview #7 (July 1976). He is an intelligent, anthropomorphic raccoon, who is an expert marksman, weapon specialist and master tactician. His name and aspects of his character are a nod to the Beatles' 1968 song "Rocky Raccoon". Rocket Raccoon appeared as a prominent member in the 2008 relaunch of the superhero team Guardians of the Galaxy.

The character has appeared in several media adaptations as a member of that team, including animated television series, toys and video games. He appears in the Marvel Cinematic Universe films Guardians of the Galaxy (2014), Guardians of the Galaxy Vol. 2 (2017), Avengers: Infinity War (2018), Avengers: Endgame (2019), and Thor: Love and Thunder (2022) and Guardians of the Galaxy: Holiday Special (2022 television film). In these appearances, Rocket Raccoon is voiced by Bradley Cooper, with motion capture provided by Sean Gunn. Rocket will return in Guardians of the Galaxy Vol. 3 (2023).

Publication history
The character was created by Bill Mantlo and Keith Giffen, and inspired by the Beatles song "Rocky Raccoon". Other references to the song were featured in Rocket's appearance in The Incredible Hulk #271  (May 1982), which was titled "Now Somewhere In the Black Holes of Sirius Major There Lived a Young Boy Named Rocket Raccoon" and saw the Hulk help Rocket stop a villain trying to steal "Gideon's Bible", which in the Marvel Universe was a book that contained the sum of all knowledge on the Loonies colony.

Rocket Raccoon first appeared in Marvel Preview #7 (Summer 1976), in the back-up feature "The Sword in the Star", under the name "Rocky". He would next appear in The Incredible Hulk #271 (May 1982), where it is learned that "Rocky" is short for "Rocket". In 1985, he received his own four-issue limited series and in an afterword to the first issue, Mantlo himself asserted that this was the same character seen in Preview, penciled by Mike Mignola and inked by Al Gordon with Al Milgrom. Rocket appeared in Quasar #15 in 1990 and later appeared in three issues of Sensational She-Hulk in 1992 (#44–46). The character only appeared in a total of ten comic books in his first thirty years of existence.

Besides a brief appearance in a 2006 issue of Exiles, Rocket Raccoon was next seen in 2007's Annihilation: Conquest and Annihilation: Conquest - Star-Lord limited series, and their spin-off series, a new volume of Guardians of the Galaxy. He remained a regular member of the series cast until it was canceled with issue #25 in 2010, also appearing in the follow-up limited series The Thanos Imperative. Along with fellow Guardian Groot, Rocket starred in backup features in Annihilators #1–4 (May 2011 – August 2011) and Annihilators: Earthfall #1–4 (November 2011 – February 2012 ).

Rocket Raccoon, along with the other members of the Guardians, appeared in issues #4-8 of Avengers Assemble, a series intended as a jumping-on point for fans of the film The Avengers. He appears prominently in Guardians of the Galaxy vol. 3, a part of the 2012 Marvel NOW! relaunch.

In February 2014, it was announced that Skottie Young would write and illustrate a Rocket Raccoon ongoing series. The series began in July 2014, with the first issue selling over 300,000 copies. Jake Parker replaced Young as the artist beginning with issue #5. The series ended in May 2015 as one of many titles to be cancelled for Marvel's Secret Wars event. A new volume, titled Rocket Raccoon and Groot, began in January 2016 as part of the All-New, All-Different Marvel relaunch.

Fictional character biography

Rocket Raccoon acts as the "Guardian of the Keystone Quadrant", an area of outer space sealed off from the rest of the cosmos by the so-called Galacian Wall. Rocket is captain of the starship Rack 'n' Ruin, and he and his first mate Wal Rus (a talking walrus) come from the planet Halfworld in the Keystone Quadrant, an abandoned colony for the mentally ill where the animal companions were genetically manipulated to grant them human level intelligence and bipedal body construction for many to become caretakers of the inmates. Rocket was Halfworld's chief law officer ("ranger") who protected the colony against various threats.

At one point, Judson Jakes tried to steal the Halfworld Bible, but was thwarted by Rocket and various animal associates. Later, Lord Dyvyne abducted Rocket's friend Lylla Otter, and Jakes began the Toy War. As the Toy War continued, Blackjack O'Hare teamed up with Rocket, and Rocket was reunited with Lylla. The Rack 'n' Ruin was soon destroyed, as Judson Jakes and Lord Dyvyne teamed up to kill Rocket Raccoon. Rocket Raccoon and his friends cured the Loonies of their mental illnesses, as Judson Jakes and Lord Dyvyne were apparently killed. Rocket and the animals as well as the robots left Halfworld and took off into space for their own adventures. Some time later, Rocket was revealed to have been a laboratory subject on the Stranger's planet, and escaped his captivity there.

Guardians of the Galaxy
Rocket Raccoon resurfaced as a member of the team chosen to accompany Star-Lord on his mission to stop a Phalanx infiltration of the Kree homeworld. Rocket is depicted as a gifted military tactician who is fearless, loyal, and insightful. It is heavily implied that he has a case of obsessive compulsive disorder. Rocket's trademark rocket skates are absent.

Rocket joins the new Guardians of the Galaxy at the behest of his friend Star-Lord. It is he who suggests that the team adopt that moniker after hearing it mentioned by Major Victory. Later, when the team almost disbands and Peter Quill (Star-Lord) disappears (sent into the Negative Zone by Ronan), Rocket keeps the team alive, and brings in Groot as member, as they had become firm friends. Rocket takes over as leader until they rescue Peter and save the Earth from an alien invasion. When the team tries to halt the growing War of Kings, Rocket leads the portion of the team assigned to make contact with the Shi'ar. They are unable to teleport into the Emperor Vulcan's flagship and have to be rescued by the Starjammers and Rocket's old friend Ch'od. They are able to bring back the rightful queen of the Shi'ar, but she is killed after Rocket departs, much to his horror.

After the Guardians disband, Rocket Raccoon takes up a normal job with Timely Inc. He and Groot were reunited and tricked into returning to Halfworld: there, he found that his memories of the place were mostly half-truths and deliberately crafted fake memories. In reality, Jakes and Blackjack O'Hare had worked with Rocket in providing security at Halfworld Asylum for the Criminally Insane; Doctor Dyvyne had been Head of Psychology there; and both the anthropomorphic animals and the automaton clowns were deliberately created to work at the asylum, as their appearance would calm the inmates. The crises that Rocket half-remembered had been caused by the psychic supervillain the Star Thief, who had been admitted as an inmate and used his psychic powers to turn the inhabitants against each other. Rocket had turned the warders into a biological "key" to keep Star-Thief locked up, and deliberately altered his mind and left Halfworld so it could never be opened - but he was tricked into returning by the Thief, whose mind had escaped into the asylum after his host body died.

When the Guardians of the Galaxy title was relaunched in 2013, Rocket was again a member of the team.

In the first issue of "Secret Wars", the Guardians of the Galaxy take part in the incursion between Earth-616 and Earth-1610, in which Rocket and Groot are killed by the Children of Tomorrow.

All-New, All-Different Marvel
As part of Marvel's 2015–2019 "All-New, All-Different Marvel branding", Rocket Raccoon takes leadership of the Guardians of the Galaxy while Star-Lord was busy handling things on Spartax.

During the crisis in Avengers: No Road Home when light itself was nearly destroyed by the ancient Greek goddess of darkness Nyx, Rocket was one of the heroes who were inadvertently assembled to fight her, including Hawkeye, Hercules, Hulk, the Scarlet Witch, Spectrum, the Vision, Voyager, and Conan the Barbarian. Once Nyx was defeated, Rocket mused that this would allow him to cross "being an Avenger" off his bucket list.

Powers and abilities
Rocket Raccoon possesses the normal attributes of an Earth raccoon, including speed (which has been additionally amplified by his training), and an acute sense of smell, sight, hearing and touch. Sharp claws allow him to scale walls, buildings, and trees with ease. He is an accomplished starship pilot, a brilliant engineer and technician, and an expert marksman with the two laser pistols he carries as well as having an affinity for heavy weapons. He is a master military tactician and leader, attributes that help him take charge of the Guardians of the Galaxy when Star-Lord is unavailable.

Reception

Critical reception 
Dominic Lerose of The Daily Cardinal called Rocket Raccoon a "top fan favorite," writing, "Rocket is the only surviving member of the Guardians of the Galaxy after Thanos’ snap for good reason. He’s the most interesting out of them all, the most emotionally vulnerable and a character audiences love not only for his cuteness and humor, but for his saddened soul and desire to fit into the dramatic universe of Marvel. Let’s hope we get to see a lot of Rocket Raccoon in “Avengers: Endgame” next month, and let’s hope he makes it out alive so we can see more of him in the future."

Accolades 

 In 2014, CBR.com included Rocket Raccoon in their "Marvel and DC's Greatest Animal Characters" list.
 In 2018, CBR.com ranked Rocket Raccoon 25th in their "25 Most Powerful Guardians Of The Galaxy" list.
 In 2021, Screen Rant ranked Rocket Raccoon 19th in their "20 Most Powerful Guardians Of The Galaxy Members In The Comics" list.
 In 2022, The A.V Club ranked Rocket Raccoon 44th in their "100 best Marvel characters" list.

Literary reception

Volumes

Rocket Raccoon - 2014 
According to Diamond Comic Distributors, Rocket Raccoon #1 was the best selling comic book in July 2014.

Jeff Lake of IGN gave Rocket Raccoon #1 a grade of 8.7 out of 10, writing, "In Rocket Raccoon #1, Skottie Young proves a quality storyteller behind the pages and on them. Though the plot is a little barebones for now, Young imbues the script with enough energy to keep it going, his amazing visuals doing the rest. Rocket's fan base will only grow in the coming months, and. Young appears well suited to do him justice."

Rocket Raccoon and Groot - 2016 
According to Diamond Comic Distributors, Rocket Raccoon and Groot #1 was the 15th best selling comic book in January 2016.

Jesse Schedeen of IGN gave Rocket Raccoon and Groot #1 a grade of 7.8 out of 10, writing, "This new series may not feel terribly "all-new" or "all-different," but it features a proven creative team exploring the continued misadventures of Rocket and Groot. It's tough to go wrong with that. Unlike some Guardians comics, this series quickly finds its niche and promises interesting wrinkles to come for both characters."

Rocket Raccoon - 2016 
According to Diamond Comic Distributors, Rocket Raccoon #1 was the 29th best selling comic book in December 2016.

Supporting characters

 Blackjack O'Hare - An anthropomorphic hare that has clashed with Rocket Raccoon.
 Lylla - An anthropomorphic otter. Lylla is the C.E.O. of the biggest toy making company in the universe, Mayhem Mekaniks on the planet Halfworld. She is also the friend and lover of Rocket Raccoon. She inherited the company after her parents were murdered by Judson Jakes who wanted control of the company. The only way for Lylla to gain full control was through marriage. Lylla soon came under threat not just through Jakes, but also through Lord Dyvyne as they both wanted to control her toy company. Luckily, Rocket Raccoon came to her aid and with the help of their friends, WalRus and Uncle Pyko, defeated both parties. Lylla traveled with Rocket afterwards to start a new life together. These events were later revealed to be false. Lylla, along with the rest of the halfworlders, were actually service animals who cared for mental patients on their planet. She was also apparently married to Blackjack O'Hare. She has not been seen since, and her marriage to Blackjack seemed retconned as he reappeared as a deadly mercenary and enemy to Rocket.
 Wal Rus - An anthropomorphic walrus. Wal Rus is an engineer who aided Rocket Raccoon in his fight in the Toy Wars of which his niece, Lylla, was the center of conflict. His metallic tusks were interchangeable and he could be used as tools or weapons. His adventures with Rocket were later retconned when Rocket and Groot visited Halfworld and discovered that the halfworlders were actually service animals for mental patients. Wal Rus served as one of the security guards who worked for Rocket and had to once again help his friend when one of the patients mental powers began to manifest after years of waiting. This was retconned, yet again and he was recently seen working for Rocket and Groot in rescuing Princess Lynx and fighting Blackjack O'Hare, his brigade and Lord Dyvyne.

In other media

Television
 Rocket Raccoon appears in The Avengers: Earth's Mightiest Heroes episode "Michael Korvac", voiced by Greg Ellis. This version is a member of the Guardians of the Galaxy.
 Rocket Raccoon appears in Ultimate Spider-Man, voiced initially by Billy West in the episode "Guardians of the Galaxy" and by Trevor Devall (for subsequent episodes). This version is a member of the Guardians of the Galaxy and served as one of Sam Alexander's trainers.
 Additionally, a pirate-themed alternate reality version of Rocket appears in the episode "Return to the Spider-Verse" Pt. 2.
 Rocket Raccoon appears in Avengers Assemble, voiced initially by Seth Green in "Guardians and Space Knights" and later by Trevor Devall in "Widow's Run".
 Rocket Raccoon appears in the Hulk and the Agents of S.M.A.S.H. episode "It's a Wonderful Smash", voiced again by Seth Green.
 Rocket Raccoon appears in Guardians of the Galaxy, voiced again by Trevor Devall.
 Rocket Raccoon appears in Marvel Super Hero Adventures: Frost Fight!, voiced again by Trevor Devall.
 Rocket Raccoon appears in Rocket & Groot, voiced again by Trevor Devall.
 Rocket Raccoon appears in Lego Marvel Super Heroes - Guardians of the Galaxy: The Thanos Threat, voiced again by Trevor Devall.
 Rocket Raccoon first appeared in Marvel Disk Wars: The Avengers, voiced by Fumihiro Okabayashi in the Japanese version and Dave Wittenberg in the English version.

Marvel Cinematic Universe

Rocket appears in media set in the Marvel Cinematic Universe, portrayed by Sean Gunn via motion capture and voiced by Bradley Cooper. This version was created by the High Evolutionary, is named 89P13, and has cybernetic implants.

Video games
 Rocket Raccoon appears as a playable character in Marvel Super Hero Squad Online.
 Rocket Raccoon appears as a playable character Ultimate Marvel vs. Capcom 3, voiced by Greg Ellis.
 Rocket Raccoon appears as a playable character in Marvel Avengers Alliance.
 Rocket Raccoon appears as a playable character in Marvel Heroes, voiced by Steve Blum.
 Two incarnations of Rocket Raccoon and Groot appear as hybrid playable characters in Marvel Puzzle Quest.
 Rocket Raccoon appears as a playable character in Lego Marvel Super Heroes, voiced by John DiMaggio.
 Rocket Raccoon appears as a playable character in Disney Infinity 2.0, voiced by Nolan North. 
 Rocket Raccoon appears as a playable character in Marvel Contest of Champions.
 Rocket Raccoon appears as a playable character in Marvel: Future Fight.
 Rocket Raccoon appears as a playable character in Disney Infinity 3.0.
 Rocket Raccoon appears in Guardians of the Galaxy: The Telltale Series, voiced by Nolan North.
 Rocket Raccoon appears as a playable character in Lego Marvel Super Heroes 2, voiced by Mikey O'Connor.
 Rocket Raccoon appears as a playable character in Marvel vs. Capcom: Infinite, voiced again by Trevor Devall.
 Rocket Raccoon and Groot appear as a hybrid playable character in Marvel Ultimate Alliance 3: The Black Order, with the former voiced again by Nolan North.
 Rocket Raccoon appears as a playable character in Marvel Powers United VR, voiced again by Trevor Devall.
 Rocket Raccoon appears as a pet in Fortnite Battle Royale.
 Rocket Raccoon appears as an NPC in Marvel Future Revolution, voiced again by Nolan North. This version is a member of Omega Flight.
 Rocket Raccoon appears in Marvel's Guardians of the Galaxy. This version is a genetically-engineered soldier created by the Kree.
 Rocket Raccoon appears in the digital collectible card game Marvel Snap.

Toys
 A Rocket Raccoon action figure was available as part of a Guardians of the Galaxy three pack in 2011 as part of the Marvel Universe toyline.
Rocket Raccoon is a Build-A-Figure in the Marvel Legends toyline released in 2013.
 A Rocket Raccoon and Groot figure set with a "Dancing Baby Groot" was released by Hot Toys.

Miscellaneous
 Rocket Raccoon appears in The Amazing Spider-Man newspaper comic strip.
 Rocket appears in Guardians of the Galaxy – Mission: Breakout! at Disney California Adventure, voiced again by Bradley Cooper.
 Rocket Raccoon appears in Marvel's Wastelanders: Old Man Star-Lord, voiced by Chris Elliott.

Collected editions

References

External links

Rocket Raccoon at the Unofficial Handbook of Marvel Comics Creators
Rocket Raccoon on Comic Vine

Animal superheroes
Anthropomorphic mammals
Characters created by Bill Mantlo
Characters created by Keith Giffen
Comics characters introduced in 1976
Fictional aerospace engineers
Fictional characters with superhuman senses
Fictional gunfighters in comics
Fictional inventors
Fictional marksmen and snipers
Fictional military strategists
Fictional raccoons
Fictional space pilots
Guardians of the Galaxy characters
Marvel Comics animals
Marvel Comics characters who can move at superhuman speeds
Marvel Comics extraterrestrial superheroes
Marvel Comics superheroes
Marvel Comics titles
Talking animals in fiction